The Fall on Deaf Ears was a musical group from El Paso, Texas, most notable for featuring Cedric Bixler-Zavala of At the Drive-In and The Mars Volta, who played drums, and Clint Newsom of Rhythm of Black Lines and The Hades Kick on guitar. The Fall on Deaf Ears played in the post-hardcore style typical of bands such as The Nation of Ulysses and Circus Lupus. They played live shows with bands such as Propagandhi, Egon and Select Your Fighter. The act only recorded a handful of songs before bassist Laura Beard and guitarist Sarah Reiser were killed in a car wreck in 1997. They were both 17 years old.

Cedric Bixler-Zavala would later write the song "Napoleon Solo" as singer/lyricist with At The Drive-in about the tragedy. 
In the 5 recorded tracks, samples of Miles Davis' "Bitches Brew" can be heard.

Zavala moved on to At the Drive-In from The Fall on Deaf Ears and later to The Mars Volta.

Members 
 Sarah Reiser - Vocals, Guitar
 Laura Beard - Vocals, Bass
 Cedric Bixler-Zavala - Drums, Vocals
 Clint Newsom - Guitar, Vocals, Recording

Discography 
 The Fall on Deaf Ears EP
1. Your Reflection - 3:38
2. Screws and Bolts - 4:30
3. Do You Speak Braille? - 2:25
4. Calls of Defilement - 4:43
5. Talking Radio Talking Star - 3:54

References

External links 
 Official Myspace
 The day the music died - UTEP Tribute page
 Sarah and Laura singing backing vocals at an early At the Drive In show

American post-hardcore musical groups
Punk rock groups from Texas